Vroomshoop is a town located at the center of the municipality Twenterand in the Dutch province of Overijssel and was founded around 1859. The earliest inhabitants lived from the peat that was found in the nearby area.

Farmers from the Groningen area played an important role by the excavated peat into farmland here. They settled mainly on the Tonnendijk Road. The Groninger-farms are still on the Tonnendijk.

History 
In 1859, the canal Almelo-De Haandrik was dug, and a peat colony developed along the canal. Around 1875, the economy became based on potatoes and colonists from Groningen and Drenthe settled in the area. The Saint Willibrord Church was finished in 1868. In 1906, the village still contained 109 sod houses. In 2009, the village of Geerdijk separated from Vroomshoop.

Transportation 
In 1906 a train station was built in Vroomshoop, because of the NOLS track from Mariënberg to Almelo.
The Original name for this station was "Den Ham - Vroomshoop", it was changed to "Vroomshoop" in 1952 because of the distance in between Den Ham and Vroomshoop.

Since 2014 Arriva operates this service.

At one time, there was a vlotbrug at Vroomshoop.

Triathlon 
Triatlon Vroomshoop  started as a one-off event in 2009 has now become an annual event which hosts approximately 700 athletes every year.
Starting 2016 it has also been the host of the Schuiteman 2deDivisie Noord, a part of the national second division championship.

Dragon boat Festival 
For the 6th time in 2014 organised by "de Smoezen", Vroomshoops carnival association.
A Chinese tradition at the canal, a spectacular boat race by different regional teams.

Notable people 
 Christian Kist, 2012 BDO World Darts Champion
 Jarno Hams, 7 times Strongest man of the Netherlands

Gallery

References 

Populated places in Overijssel
Salland
Twente
Twenterand